Four-carbon molecules are based on a skeleton made from four carbon atoms. They may be in a chain, branched chains, cycles or even bicyclic compounds

Hydrocarbons that include four atoms are:

butane C4H10
isobutane C4H10
but-1-ene C4H8
but-2-ene C4H8
but-1-yne C4H6
but-2-yne C4H6
isobutylene C4H8
butadiene C4H6
1,2-butadiene C4H6
vinylacetylene C4H4
diacetylene C4H2
butatriene C4H4
cyclobutane C4H8
cyclobutene C4H6
cyclobutyne C4H4
cyclobutadiene C4H4
methylenecyclopropene C4H4
bicyclobutane C4H6
1-bicyclobutene C4H4
Δ1,3-bicyclobutene C4H4 
propalene C4H2
methylcyclopropane C4H8
1-methylcyclopropene C4H6
3-methylcyclopropene C4H6
methylenecyclopropane C4H6
3-methylcyclopropyne C4H4
methylenecyclopropyne C4H2
tetrahedrane C4H4

See also
List of compounds with carbon number 4

Hydrocarbons